Trillium cernuum is a species of flowering plant in the bunchflower family Melanthiaceae. The specific epithet cernuum means "drooping, curving forwards, facing downwards", a distinctive habit of its flower. It is commonly called nodding trillium or nodding wakerobin (not to be confused with Trillium flexipes) since the flower is invariably found nodding beneath the leaves. It is sometimes referred to as the northern nodding trillium to distinguish from Trillium rugelii, a similar nodding species native to the southern Appalachian Mountains. It is also called the whip-poor-will flower since presumably its bloom coincides with the spring arrival of the migrating bird with the same name.

Trillium cernuum was thought to be one of three species of Trillium described by Swedish botanist Carl Linnaeus in 1753 (the other two being Trillium erectum and Trillium sessile). The specimen examined by Linnaeus was actually Trillium catesbaei, a nodding species native to the southern Appalachian Mountains where Trillium cernuum does not occur. This oversight led to much confusion, some of which continues to this day. Within its natural range, Trillium cernuum is often confused with two closely related Trillium species, Trillium erectum and Trillium flexipes. The three species are known to interbreed with one another, which adds to the confusion.

The nodding trillium is the most northerly Trillium species in North America, occurring as far north as Hudson Bay and as far south as northern Virginia (reports south of Virginia are most likely other species such as Trillium rugelii, Trillium catesbaei, or Trillium flexipes). Trillium cernuum is found on rich, moist soils in both broadleaf and coniferous woodlands.

Description
Trillium cernuum is a perennial herbaceous plant that spreads by means of an underground rhizome.

Flowering occurs from late April to early June, possibly as late as July in the northern part of its range. The flower is bisexual with six stamens and a single white (or pink) ovary shaped like a pyramid. Each stamen consists of a thin white filament and a pale lavender-pink (or gray) anther. The filaments and anthers are about the same length.

If the flower is successfully pollinated, a single fruit develops. Initially the fruit is white (or pink), ripening to a dark red by late summer.

Historically, Trillium cernuum has been confused with several nodding Trillium species native to the southern Appalachian Mountains. (See the Taxonomy section for more background information.) Within its natural range, T. cernuum is often confused with two sympatric Trillium species, T. erectum and T. flexipes. The following table compares these three species character by character while emphasizing the important characteristics of T. cernuum:

Identification typically requires a mature, flowering plant. When not in flower, the three species are difficult to distinguish. Moreover, the three species are known to interbreed with one another, which can add to the confusion.

To distinguish among T. cernuum, T. erectum, and T. flexipes, start by examining the pedicel. More importantly, the pedicel of T. cernuum is strongly recurved below the leaves while the other two species rarely exhibit this behavior.

Northern forms of T. flexipes tend to have recurved pedicels and/or recurved petals. These forms closely resemble large plants of T. cernuum and so the two are often confused. In such cases, examine the stamens. The anthers of T. cernuum are slender, lavender-pink or purplish, with the anthers and filaments approximately equal in length, while the anthers of T. flexipes are thick, creamy white or yellow, with the anthers greatly exceeding the length of the usually very short filaments.

Taxonomy
Trillium cernuum was first thought to be described by Carl Linnaeus in 1753. Linnaeus gave the location of his type specimen as "Carolina" but T. cernuum (in the modern sense) does not range that far south. The resulting confusion surrounding the pedicellate-flowered Trillium species persisted for 150 years. In 1906, Gleason shed some light on the confusion by showing how to distinguish T. cernuum from T. flexipes on the basis of anther-filament ratio. However, Gleason mistakenly believed that the range of T. cernuum extended south to Georgia. Finally, in 1938, Barksdale showed conclusively that the specimen described by Linnaeus was actually T. catesbaei and that T. cernuum is absent from the southern Appalachian Mountains.

, Plants of the World Online (POWO) lists 14 synonyms for T. cernuum. Although POWO accepts no infraspecific names, numerous varieties and forms have been described. For example, Eames and Wiegand described T. cernuum var. macranthum in 1923. The typical variety, found along the North American coast from Delaware to Newfoundland, is described as a small delicate plant, while variety macranthum, found elsewhere, is claimed to be larger and more robust. Although there may be regional size trends, much of the variation in size is largely dependent upon soil nutrients, and so the variety is not generally accepted by botanists.

Edgar T. Wherry (1885-1982) described Trillium cernuum f. tangerae in 1945. With deep rose-colored petals, the form is thought to be a hybrid with T. erectum.

Distribution and habitat
The range of Trillium cernuum extends across Canada, from Saskatchewan in the west to Newfoundland in the east, and as far south as northern Virginia in the mid-Atlantic United States. The species is known to occur in the following provinces, states, and territories:

 Canada: Manitoba, New Brunswick, Newfoundland and Labrador, Nova Scotia, Ontario, Prince Edward Island, Quebec, Saskatchewan
 United States: Connecticut, Delaware, District of Columbia, Illinois, Indiana, Iowa, Maine, Maryland, Massachusetts, Michigan, Minnesota, New Hampshire, New Jersey, New York, North Dakota, Ohio, Pennsylvania, Rhode Island, South Dakota, Vermont, Virginia, West Virginia, Wisconsin
 Other: Saint Pierre and Miquelon

At the southern end of its range, T. cernuum grows in rich, cool, moist to swampy deciduous woods, and along shrubby stream banks and pond edges of deep forests. In Michigan, it also occurs along streams and swamps, but in conifer-hardwood forests. In its northern range, it occurs in dryer (although still moist), upland deciduous-coniferous woods.

, T. cernuum is globally secure. It is vulnerable (or worse) in at least a dozen states and provinces. In particular, it is critically imperiled in Illinois, Indiana, and West Virginia. In Lake County, Ohio, a single specimen was collected in 1879, but T. cernuum is now thought to be extirpated from Ohio.

Bibliography

References

External links

 
 
 
 
 
 
 

cernuum
Flora of Eastern Canada
Flora of the Northeastern United States
Flora of the North-Central United States
Flora of the United States
Flora of the Appalachian Mountains
Flora of the Great Lakes region (North America)
Least concern flora of the United States
Least concern flora of North America
Plants described in 1753
Taxa named by Carl Linnaeus